A dough conditioner, flour treatment agent, improving agent or bread improver is any ingredient or chemical added to bread dough to strengthen its texture or otherwise improve it in some way. Dough conditioners may include enzymes, yeast nutrients, mineral salts, oxidants and reductants, bleaching agents and emulsifiers. They are food additives combined with flour to improve baking functionality. Flour treatment agents are used to increase the speed of dough rising and to improve the strength and workability of the dough. While they are an important component of modern factory baking, some small-scale bakers reject them in favour of longer fermentation periods that produce greater depth of flavour.

These agents are often sold as mixtures in a soy flour base, as only small amounts are required.

Examples
Examples of dough conditioners include ascorbic acid, distilled monoglycerides, citrate ester of monoglycerides, diglycerides, ammonium chloride, enzymes, diacetyl tartaric acid ester of monoglycerides or DATEM, potassium bromate, calcium salts such as calcium iodate, L-cystine, L-cysteine HCl, glycerol monostearate, azodicarbonamide, sodium stearoyl lactylate, sucrose palmitate or sucrose ester, polyoxyethylene sorbitan monostearate or polysorbate, soybean lecithin, and soybean lecithin enriched with lysophospholipids.

Less processed dough conditioners include sprouted- or malted-grain flours, soy, milk, wheat germ, eggs, potatoes, gluten, yeast, and extra kneading. Malted, diastatic flours are not typically added by manufacturers to whole-wheat flours. Robertson et al. point out that some of the better information is found in baking books published back when bakers were still kneading by hand.

History

In the early 1900s it was discovered the use of calcium chloride, ammonium sulfate, and potassium bromate halved the amount of yeast needed to raise dough. These mixtures were generally known as mineral yeast foods or yeast nutrient salts. After they became popular among bakers, one patented yeast food was analyzed by Connecticut Agricultural Experiment Station chief chemist J.P. Street who published in 1917 that it contained, "calcium sulphate, 25; ammonium chlorid, 9.7; potassium bromate, 0.3; sodium chlorid, 25; patent wheat flour, 40." They contain water conditioners, yeast conditioners, and dough conditioners.

Yeast nutrients

Yeast requires water, carbon sources such as starch and simple carbohydrates, nitrogen preferably as ammonium as it cannot assimilate nitrate, sulfur, phosphorus (often as inorganic phosphate), and minute quantities of vitamins and elemental mineral ions including B, Ca, Co, Cu, Fe, K, Mo, Mn, Mg, Ni, and Zn. Ammonium chloride, ammonium sulfate, or ammonium phosphate may be used as sources of nitrogen. Phosphoric acid, an acidulant, is used as a yeast stimulant. Calcium iodate, an oxidant, is a U.S. Food and Drug Administration generally recognized as safe or GRAS source of calcium.

Oxidants and reductants

Oxidizing agents are added to flour to help with gluten development. They may or may not also act as bleaching agents. Originally flour was naturally aged through exposure to the atmosphere. Oxidizing agents primarily affect sulfur-containing amino acids, ultimately helping to form disulfide bridges between the gluten molecules. The addition of these agents to flour will create a stronger dough. Dehydroascorbic acid and potassium bromate are oxidants, acting on sulfhydryl groups and disulfide bonds in wheat dough, in particular oxidizing glutathione. Potassium bromate acts more directly or with fewer chemical conversion steps than ascorbic acid. Glutathione increases wheat dough's extensibility, or relaxes it, while oxidizing a dough's glutathione increases elasticity. Common oxidizing agents are:
 ascorbic acid　(Ascorbic acid converts into its oxidizing form, dehydroascorbic acid (DHAA) during mixing.)
 azodicarbonamide (E927)
 potassium bromate (E924, the component which gives bromated flour its name, used mainly in the U.S. East and Midwest, acts as a bleaching agent, banned in some areas)
 potassium iodate

Reducing agents help to weaken the flour by breaking the protein network. This will help with various aspects of handling a strong dough. The benefits of adding these agents are reduced mixing time, reduced dough elasticity, reduced proofing time, and improved machinability. Cysteine and bisulfite are reducing agents which relax wheat dough. Adding minute amounts of oxidants or reducing agents alter the post-mix handling characteristics of dough. Common reducing agents are:
 L-cysteine (E920, E921; quantities in the tens of ppm range help soften the dough and thus reduce processing time)
 fumaric acid
 sodium bisulfite
 non-leavening yeast (ruptured cells)

Emulsifiers

Lecithin, monoglycerides, diglycerides, and DATEM are considered emulsifiers. They disperse fat more evenly throughout the dough, helping it to trap more of the  produced by yeast. Lecithin added at a rate of 0.25-to-0.6% of the flour weight acts as a dough conditioner. Based on total weight, egg yolk contains about 9% lecithin. Monoglycerides and diglycerides replace eggs in baked goods. Emulsifiers tend to produce a finer grain, softer crumb, and with longer proof times, increased baked volume and have antistaling effects.

Enzymes
Enzymes are also used to improve processing characteristics. Yeast naturally produces both amylases and proteinases, but additional quantities may be added to produce faster and more complete reactions.
 Amylases break down the starch in flours into simple sugars, thereby letting yeast ferment quickly. Malt is a natural source of amylase.
 Proteases improve extensibility of the dough by degrading some of the gluten.
 Lipoxygenases oxidize the flour.

Other agents
Other additives may be used as yeast nutrients or as a source of enzymes:
 carbamide (also known as urea) (E927b)
 phosphates
 malted barley

See also
 Chorleywood bread process

Notes

References

Bibliography
 Hui Y and Cork H (2006). Bakery products: science and technology. Blackwell Publishing.

External links
 Is ADA our friend or foe? at Bakerpedia

Food additives